Whoops! (Swedish: Hoppsan!) is a 1955 Swedish comedy mystery film directed by Stig Olin and starring Povel Ramel, Harriet Andersson and Sven Lindberg. It was shot at the Centrumateljéerna Studios in Stockholm. The film's sets were designed by the art directors Yngve Gamlin and Nils Nilsson.

Cast
 Povel Ramel as Hubert Yrhage
 Harriet Andersson as 	Lena Lett
 Sven Lindberg as 	Gary Lundberg
 Douglas Håge as 	Darling Karlsson
 Georg Rydeberg as Jens Myskovich
 Carl-Gustaf Lindstedt as 	Tyko Kölstav
 Ingrid Thulin as Malou Hjorthage
 Lissi Alandh asLillan Persson-Quist
 Olle Pettersson as Jan Järpe
 Marianne Löfgren as 	Juttan Järpe
 Elsa Prawitz as Sylvia Blidfjell
 Curt Löwgren as 	Fritiof Andersson
 Gull Natorp as 	Beda
 Signe Wirff as 	Anna
 Olof Sandborg as 	Major Löwenbräu
 Margit Andelius as Chairman at the meeting
 Mona Geijer-Falkner as 	Woman at the meeting
 Astrid Bodin as Woman with dog
 Julie Bernby as Darlings spion 
 Agda Helin as Mrs. Andersson 
 Sven Holmberg as Police Officer 
 Hanny Schedin as 	Kund i mjölkaffären 
 Mille Schmidt as 	Inspicient på båten Vågspelet
 Marianne Nielsen as 	Guitar Player 
 Gösta Prüzelius as 	Custom Official
 Per-Axel Arosenius as Police Officer
 Birger Åsander as Crook

References

Bibliography 
 Qvist, Per Olov & von Bagh, Peter. Guide to the Cinema of Sweden and Finland. Greenwood Publishing Group, 2000.

External links 
 

1955 films
Swedish comedy films
1955 comedy films
1950s Swedish-language films
Films directed by Stig Olin
Swedish black-and-white films
1950s Swedish films